Nash is a town in Grant County, Oklahoma, United States. The population was 204 at the 2010 census, an 8.9 percent decline from the figure of 224 in 2000. Nash once shared a school district with the town of Jet, several miles away along U.S. Route 64, but the school folded in 2013 and high school students now attend schools which comprise part of the Timberlake Regional School District, based in Helena. The elementary school is still located in Jet.

Geography
Nash is located at  (36.664892, -98.052487).

Demographics

As of the census of 2000, there were 224 people, 95 households, and 66 families residing in the town. There were 128 housing units at an average density of 398.5 per square mile (154.4/km2). The racial makeup of the town was 95.54% White, 3.12% Native American, 0.89% Asian, and 0.45% from two or more races.

There were 95 households, out of which 31.6% had children under the age of 18 living with them, 64.2% were married couples living together, 5.3% had a female householder with no husband present, and 29.5% were non-families. 28.4% of all households were made up of individuals, and 17.9% had someone living alone who was 65 years of age or older. The average household size was 2.36 and the average family size was 2.90.

In the town, the population was spread out, with 22.8% under the age of 18, 5.8% from 18 to 24, 28.1% from 25 to 44, 23.7% from 45 to 64, and 19.6% who were 65 years of age or older. The median age was 40 years. For every 100 females, there were 82.1 males. For every 100 females age 18 and over, there were 88.0 males.

The median income for a household in the town was $24,063, and the median income for a family was $39,375. Males had a median income of $30,714 versus $16,667 for females. The per capita income for the town was $13,864. None of the families and 3.8% of the population were living below the poverty line, including none of those under the age of 18 and 8.9% of those 65 or older.

References

Towns in Grant County, Oklahoma
Towns in Oklahoma